The 2010 Girls' Youth NORCECA Volleyball Championship was played from April 27 to May 2, 2010 in Guatemala City, Guatemala. Ten teams competed in this tournament. United States won the tournament for the sixth time defeating Mexico. Puerto Rico joined the United States and Mexico to compete at the 2011 Girls' U18 World Championship. Samantha Bricio of Mexico was named the tournament MVP.

Competing nations

Squads

Preliminary round
All times are in Peru Standard Time (UTC−05:00)

Group A

Group B

Group C

Final round

Championship bracket

Quarterfinals

|}

Classification 7–10

|}

Classification 7–8

|}

Semifinals

|}

Fifth place match

|}

Bronze medal match

|}

Final

|}

Final standing

Individual awards

Most Valuable Player
 
Best Scorer
 
Best Setter
 

Best Middle Blockers
 
Best Libero
 
Best Server
 
Best Receiver

References

External links
Official Website
Regulations
Summary of Stats

Women's NORCECA Volleyball Championship
P
Volleyball
2010 in women's volleyball